Peter Geoffrey Lansdown (born 28 March 1947) is a Welsh ornithologist.

He was the fourth chairman of the British Birds Rarities Committee, serving from 1986 to 1993. He has also served on the British Ornithologists' Union Records Committee.

References
 Pemberton, John E. (1997) Who's Who in Ornithology 

British ornithologists
1947 births
Living people
Welsh zoologists
Place of birth missing (living people)
20th-century British zoologists